Fantasy No. 1 with fugue in C major, K. 394 (Fantasie in German) is a piece of music for solo piano composed by Wolfgang Amadeus Mozart in 1782. The fantasy begins with an adagio tempo indication. The opening bars feature strong dynamic contrasts. (Forte in bar 1  suddenly changes to Piano in bar 2). The opening adagio changes to andante 8 bars later; at this point the right hand starts playing triplet semiquavers, whilst the left hand moves above the right hand for rising quaver arpeggios and then back down to play a descending dotted semiquaver in its normal position alternately.  The tempo marking changes again, this time to piu adagio before a final tempo primo 8 bars later. The fantasy ends in G major, the dominant of C major.

The Fugue is marked andante maestoso, which changes to adagio for the final 2 bars. The fugue ends in the tonic key, C major.

External links

Compositions for solo piano
Compositions by Wolfgang Amadeus Mozart
1782 compositions